Eucereon sylvius is a moth of the subfamily Arctiinae. It was described by Stoll in 1790. It is found in Suriname and the Amazon region.

References

sylvius
Moths described in 1790